Połajewo  is a village in Czarnków-Trzcianka County, Greater Poland Voivodeship, in west-central Poland. It is the seat of the gmina (administrative district) called Gmina Połajewo.

The village has a population of 2,237.

References

Villages in Czarnków-Trzcianka County